The Northwest League Most Valuable Player Award (MVP) is an annual award given to the best player in Minor League Baseball's Northwest League based on their regular-season performance as voted on by league managers. League broadcasters, Minor League Baseball executives, and members of the media have previously voted as well. Though the league was established in 1955, the award was not created until 1981. After the cancellation of the 2020 season, the league was known as the High-A West in 2021 before reverting to the Northwest League name in 2022.

Twenty outfielders have won the MVP Award, the most of any position. First basemen, with 13 winners, have won the most among infielders, followed by third basemen (7), shortstops (3), and second basemen (1). No pitchers or catchers have won the award.

One player who has won the MVP Award also won the Northwest League Top MLB Prospect Award in the same season: Zac Veen (2022). From 1981 to 2014, pitchers were eligible to win the MVP Award as no award was designated for pitchers. In 2015, the Northwest League established a Pitcher of the Year Award.

Ten players from the Spokane Indians have been selected for the MVP Award, more than any other team in the league, followed by the Everett AquaSox (7); the Boise Hawks (5); the Eugene Emeralds and Salem-Keizer Volcanoes (4); the Vancouver Canadians (3); the Medford Athletics, Southern Oregon Timberjacks, and Yakima Bears (2); and the Bellingham Mariners, Everett Giants, Tri-Cities Triplets, and Walla Walla Padres (1).

Eight players from the Seattle Mariners Major League Baseball (MLB) organization have won the award, more than any other, followed by the San Diego Padres organization (7); the Oakland Athletics, San Francisco Giants, and Texas Rangers organizations (5); the Los Angeles Angels organization (4); the Kansas City Royals organization (3); the Arizona Diamondbacks, Colorado Rockies, and Toronto Blue Jays organizations (2); and the Chicago Cubs organization (1).

Winners

Wins by team

Active Northwest League teams appear in bold.

Wins by organization

Active Northwest League–Major League Baseball affiliations appear in bold.

References
Specific

General

Awards established in 1981
Minor league baseball MVP award winners
Minor league baseball trophies and awards
MVP